David Pierce may refer to:

David Hyde Pierce (born 1959), American actor, director and comedian
David Pierce (CEO), American businessman, former CEO of Atari, Inc
David Pierce (politician), American politician in New Hampshire
Dave Pierce (born 1972), Canadian songwriter, composer and producer
David Pierce (baseball), American college baseball coach
David Pierce Jr. (1786–1872), Vermont lawyer and politician

See also
David Pearce (disambiguation)